The Maschinengewehr Modell 1911 or  MG 11 is a Swiss heavy machine gun which was introduced before and during  World War I. The MG 11 has a close constructive relationship with the German MG 08 heavy machine gun.

History
The MG 11 was based on the water-cooled Maxim machine gun, which had been developed by Hiram Stevens Maxim in 1885. The MG 11 was the last of a series of Swiss derivatives of the Maxim machine gun.

7.5 mm Maschinengewehr Modells

1894 (MG 94) 

Between 1891 and 1894 Switzerland procured 72 heavy machine guns, designated MG 94, from Maxim and Nordenfelt in London . These weapons were issued to fortress troops and mountain troops and were operational until 1944 as spare arms with the Territorial Battalion. The MG 94 was mounted at the front end and at the rear on the knees of the gunner. Two leather padded rings on the left and on the right sides of the breech of the weapon rested on the knees of the machine gunner sitting behind it and permitted sweeping fire. The machine gun MG 94 was chambered for the 7.5x53.5 mm GP 90 cartridge and was later, along other minor technical modifications, adapted for firing the more powerful 7.5x55 mm GP 11 cartridge. Six MG 94s had their water-cooling mantles drilled and cut open, making these guns air-cooled and thus water-free and lighter for use as aircraft machine guns. These six MG 94 air-cooled guns were taken out of service in 1944.

1900 (MG 00) 

In 1899 Switzerland procured 69 heavy machine guns, designated MG 00, mainly from Vickers, Sons & Maxim in London. These guns had tripod mounts designed for cavalry use with a gunner's seat attached to the rear support strut. The machine gun MG 00 was chambered for the 7.5x53.5 mm GP 90 cartridge and was later adapted for firing the more powerful 7.5x55 mm GP 11 cartridge.

1911 (MG 11) 

The MG 11 at first was originally procured from DWM Berlin (original designations MG 09). As German deliveries ceased during World War I, the manufacturing of the MG 11 was taken up in 1915 by the Eidgenössischen Waffenfabrik W+F (confederate weapon factory W+F) Bern.<ref name="Am Rhyn, Reinhart">Am Rhyn, Michael und Reinhart, Christian: Bewaffnung und Ausrüstung der Schweizer Armee seit 1817, Band 14, Automatwaffen II, Maschinengewehre, Sturmgewehre, Minenwerfer. Zürich 1983. S. 228</ref>

The MG 11 was a water-cooled heavy machine gun and mounted on a tripod. It was chambered for 7.5x55 mm GP 11 ammunition and came into service with the army, cavalry and was also used in fortresses, tanks and on airplanes of the Swiss Army. The gun body was the same as in German MG 08: a slightly modified design, which was lighter than the previous versions in Swiss service thanks to use of better steel instead of brass and lower-quality steel. The tripod was designed from scratch as originally the naval mount for the MG 08. When applied in a fortress an optical sight and ball armoured screen was applied, the water cooling was connected to a tank and a sealing rubber was mounted behind the muzzle to prevent the penetration of flamethrower oil into the bunker.

1934/1935  modernization programme
In 1934 and 1935 the MG 11 machine guns were adapted for using then modern metal machine gun belts that started to replace the canvas belts used by the original Maxim machine guns. A flash suppressor at the muzzle was also introduced. Further a new trigger system was fitted that allowed one handed firing, so the gunner could simultaneously operate the sweeping fire control wheel at the tripod, and additional kit for anti aircraft usage. The modernized MG 11 machine guns were marked with a white stripe running along the length of the cooling sleeve.

Beginning in the early 1950s the MG 11 was gradually replaced by the air-cooled 7.5 mm Maschinengewehr Modell 1957 (MG 51) general-purpose machine gun. The replacement process was finished in the 1980s.

Variants
 MG 94 on knee-mount
 MG 00 on tripod, with simple sweep mounting
 MG 11 standard version during World War I
 MG 11 (revisions 1934/1935)

References

Sources
 Schweizerische Armee (Hrsg.): Technisches Reglement Nr. 3, Das schwere Maschinenge-wehr (Mg. 11), provisorische Ausgabe 1939, Bern 1939
 Bericht des Chefs des Generalstabes der Armee an den Oberbefehlshaber der Armee über den Aktivdienst 1939-45
 Robert G. Segel (14 October 2011) "The Swiss MG11 Maxim Machine Gun", Small Arms Defense Journal'',·Vol. 2, No. 3
 Maschinengewehre und leichte Fliegerabwehr, Bulletin für die Mitglieder des Vereins Schweizer Armeemuseum, 2007/1

External links 
 
 

Machine guns of Switzerland
Heavy machine guns